The qualifying play-off of the 2014 AFC Cup was played on 2 February 2014, to decide two of the 32 places in the group stage.

Format
The bracket for the qualifying play-off was determined by the AFC. Each tie was played as a single match. Extra time and penalty shoot-out were used to decide the winner if necessary. The winners of each advanced to the group stage to join the 30 automatic qualifiers.

Teams
The following four teams (all from West Asia Zone) were entered into the qualifying play-off:

Matches

|}

References

External links
AFC Cup, the-AFC.com

1